The U.S. Senate Select Committee on Ethics is a select committee of the United States Senate charged with dealing with matters related to senatorial ethics. It is also commonly referred to as the Senate Ethics Committee. Senate rules require the Ethics Committee to be evenly divided between the Democrats and the Republicans, no matter who controls the Senate, although the chairman always comes from the majority party. The leading committee member of the minority party is referred to as Vice Chairman rather than the more common Ranking Member.

History
The Senate Select Committee on Standards and Conduct was first convened in the 89th Congress (1965–66) and later replaced by the Senate Select Committee on Ethics in the 95th Congress (1977–78).

Membership
Pursuant to Senate Rule 25, the committee is limited to six members, and is equally divided between Democrats and Republicans. This effectively means that either party can veto any action taken by the committee.

Current membership

Chairs

List of chairs of the Senate Select Committee on Ethics

Historical committee rosters

110th Congress

111th Congress

112th Congress 

Source:

113th Congress 

Source:

114th Congress 

Source:

115th Congress
Members of the Senate Select Committee on Ethics, 115th Congress

116th Congress

117th Congress

See also
List of current United States Senate committees
United States House Committee on Ethics

References

External links
U.S. Senate Select Committee on Ethics Official Website (Archive)
Senate Ethics Committee. Legislation activity and reports, Congress.gov.

Ethics
Ethics
Ethics organizations
Government agencies with year of establishment missing
1960s establishments in the United States
Parliamentary committees on Justice